Elizabeth I  is a three-part British docudrama first broadcast in 2017 about Elizabeth I, and starring Lily Cole as a titular character and Vincent Kerschbaum as Duke of Feria.

In May 2017, Leeds historian Dan Jones co-wrote and co-presented, with Dr. Suzannah Lipscomb, Elizabeth I which was shown on Channel 5.

Cast
 Lily Cole as Elizabeth I
 Vincent Kerschbaum as Duke of Feria
 James Oliver Wheatley as Thomas Seymour
 Ray Bullock Jnr as Bishop Stephen Gardiner

Episode list

References

External links
 
 "Breaking news: new history series on Elizabeth I" at suzannahlipscomb.com, August 2016

2017 British television series debuts
2017 British television series endings
2010s British drama television series
2010s British documentary television series
Channel 5 (British TV channel) original programming
2010s British television miniseries
Documentaries about historical events
Cultural depictions of Elizabeth I
English-language television shows
Television shows set in Lithuania
Television set in Tudor England